New York Hakoah is an American soccer club based in New York City, which takes its name from two earlier, defunct clubs.
Hakoah (roughly translated as "strength" from Hebrew) is a frequent name for sport and social Jewish clubs around the world, something linked with the original clubs' ties to the Jewish community.

New York Hakoah I 

Originally formed by former players from Hakoah Vienna, including Béla Guttmann and Rudolph Nickolsburger, they initially played in the Eastern Soccer League in the fall of 1928.  In 1929 they won the 1929 National Challenge Cup, now known as the Lamar Hunt U.S. Open Cup.  In 1930 they merged with Brooklyn Hakoah of the American Soccer League to become the Hakoah All-Stars.

New York Hakoah II 

The name was revived just prior to the 1956–57 season when a revived Brooklyn Hakoah merged with New York Americans to become the New York Hakoah-Americans. They then became New York Hakoah for the 1962–63 season. They were American Soccer League champions three times in a row between 1957 and 1959.

Kurt Lamm coached the team for 14 years, including during their three consecutive American Soccer League Championships (1955–56 to 1957–58. He was ASL’s Manager of the Year in the 1957–58 and 1962–63 seasons.

New York Hakoah III 

Originally called Sport Club Hakoah Bergen County, the modern club was established in 2009. Ron Glickman decided to try and rebuild the Hakoah club in the New York City suburb of Teaneck, New Jersey. Scouting for players was done via local college rosters and direct contact with college coaches. At the beginning of the 2011–2012 season, the club came to an agreement with Fairleigh Dickinson University to use University Stadium as the team's home field. Sponsorship agreements were also announced with a shirt sponsorship deal from El Al Israel Airlines in addition All Ways Travel and Data Life. Hakoah Bergen County joined the North Jersey Soccer League Premier West Division for the 2011/12 season where they finished in fourth place.

In August 2012, the club announced that they would re-brand and continue the legacy of New York Hakoah.

Year-by-year

References

Jewish football clubs
Hakoah
Hakoah sport clubs
Jews and Judaism in New York City
Eastern Professional Soccer League (1928–29) teams
American Soccer League (1933–1983) teams
Hakoah All-Stars
2009 establishments in New York (state)
Soccer clubs in New Jersey
Association football clubs established in 2009
Diaspora soccer clubs in the United States
U.S. Open Cup winners